Tadpong Lar-tham (born May 26, 1986) is a Thai professional footballer who plays as a striker.

External links
 Profile at Goal

1986 births
Living people
Tadpong Lar-tham
Tadpong Lar-tham
Association football forwards
Tadpong Lar-tham
Tadpong Lar-tham
Tadpong Lar-tham